Johannes Gerhardus Strydom (born 6 September 1979, in Cape Town) is a South African first class cricketer for South Western Districts. A left-handed batsman, Strydom made his first class debut in 2000–01.

References
 

1979 births
Living people
Cricketers from Cape Town
Afrikaner people
South African people of Dutch descent
Boland cricketers
Cape Cobras cricketers
South African cricketers
South Western Districts cricketers